Francesco Xanto Avelli (Rovigo, c. 1487? – c. 1542?) was an Italian ceramicist.  He is best known for his painted maiolica works.

Life
Xanto Avelli was born in Rovigo, in the Veneto, sometime in the late 1480s.  Nothing at all is known of his origins, his teaching, or his early years; he is first recorded as working in Urbino in 1530, when he is mentioned in a notarial document describing attempts by a group of pottery workers, or interlaboratores artis figuli, to form an early trade union for the purpose of raising wages.  1530 is also the date on his earliest signed piece, a plate commemorating the coming new year.  It is signed .f.X.A.R., and is further marked î Urbino.

At around this time Xanto married a woman called Finalissa, also in Urbino.  Over the five years following he produced a large body of work; each piece was signed in various manners, and was dated and marked as a product of Urbino.  Such consistency in signing his work was unusual at the time; there is some suggestion that the artist was blacklisted after the labor troubles of 1530, and that his choice to sign his works might be in some way related to his difficulties.

After 1535, Xanto seems to have become less prolific; his works, if signed, are marked in more cursory fashion.  He also had a number of associates and followers working with him regularly, basing their style on his.  The last documentary record of him comes in 1541, when he is known to have taken on two assistants; that year he also initialed a piece from the workshop of Francesco de Silvano.  What later became of him is unknown.

Work
It is not certain whether or not any of Xanto's earlier work has survived, as no unambiguously signed works bearing his signature have been found dating earlier than 1530.  General scholarly opinion holds that a number of works dating back to 1524 are also by his hand.  No tangible evidence exists suggesting their point of origin, although both Faenza and Urbino have been proposed by historians.

Xanto's signed works all date from between 1530 and 1542.  Each bears his name and the date of the piece; many also were given ambitious tags explaining their meanings.  The surviving pieces appear to be similar in nature, with the exception of the signatures, to most other maiolica ware produced in Urbino at the time.  Xanto signed his works with a number of different variants of his own name; besides those with his full name, pieces signed fra Xanto in his hand are known to exist.

Besides being a ceramicist, Xanto was also a poet; in the 1530s he wrote a sequence of sonnets in praise of Francesco Maria I della Rovere, then duke of Urbino.  An elegant fair copy survives in the Vatican Library.

Notes

References

Biography from the National Gallery of Art, Washington
Biography from the Getty Museum

1480s births
1540s deaths
People from Rovigo
15th-century Italian painters
Italian male painters
16th-century Italian painters
Italian potters
Maiolica painters
16th-century Italian poets
16th-century male writers
Italian Renaissance painters
Italian Mannerist painters